Hitimpulse is an international production team based in Berlin, Germany. They are best known for producing and writing songs for artists such as Kygo,  Ellie Goulding, AJ Mitchell, Ava Max, Gashi, Felix Jaehn, Alma, Tove Lo.

Career 
The team consists of Jonas Kalisch, Henrik Meinke, Alexsej Vlasenko and Jeremy Chacon. Their shared passion for music and each other's beats led to them meeting up in Berlin to do some sessions together – and Hitimpulse was born.

In 2016, Hitimpulse released the song "I'm in Love with the Coco" via B1 Recordings and Ultra Music. The song, inspired by the 2014 original single by hip hop recording artist O.T. Genasis, is a remix of the cover version by English singer Ed Sheeran. The song received over 120 million plays on major streaming platforms. The official music video, filming the lives of the farmers on a cocoa estate in Trinidad, was released. Hitimpulse also released the song "Cut the Cord" with musician Felix Jaehn.

In 2017, they released their 2nd single "Cover Girls" featuring Bibi Bourelly.

Discography

Songwriting & Production

Singles

Remixes 

2015
 Rihanna – "Bitch Better Have My Money"
 Rae Sremmurd – "No Type"
 Becky G – "Can’t Stop Dancing"
 Sam Smith – "Fast Car"
 The King's Son and Shaggy – "I’m Not Rich"
 Ed Sheeran – "Coco"
 Lost Frequencies featuring Janieck Devy – "Reality"
 Sumera — "Wolf"

2016
 Parson James – "Temple"
 Jay Sean & Sean Paul – "Make My Love Go"
 Rhodes – "Wishes"

2017
 Zara Larsson – "Only You"

References 

German DJs
German electronic music groups
Musicians from Berlin
Deep house musicians
Electronic dance music DJs
Remixers